Lisbeth Klastrup (born in 1970) is a Danish scholar of new media. Although her early research was on hypertext fiction, she is now best known for her research on virtual worlds, particularly  MMOGs such as EverQuest and World of Warcraft. Klastrup focuses on real-life virtual worlds and how they are used from a social and storytelling perspective, especially concerning online gaming and worldliness. However, she is also well-recognized for her presentation of amusing anecdotes, which she then connects to larger research questions. Klastrup's discussion of her EverQuest character's "trouser quest" (paper presented at Digital Arts and Culture in 2003) is an example of this. Another project, the Death Stories Project,  looks into representations of death in MMOGs.

Klastrup, particularly in a Danish context, also does research on the uses of social media, such as Facebook, Twitter, blogs, and moblogs, in which she finds a connection between offline and online communication. She is also interested in how users engage with politicians and cultural institutions on social media platforms. She also started to examine more closely the use and spreading of viral content and memes on Facebook. Until 2016 she maintained a list of blogs by Danish researchers.

Klastrup is based in Copenhagen, Denmark, and works as an associate professor at the IT University of Copenhagen, where she is affiliated with the Innovative Communication Research Group and the Center for Computer Game Research. In the academic year 2006-2007, she was on  leave from the IT University, working as an associate research professor at the Center for Design Research Copenhagen, joining her colleague Ida Engholm. Engholm and Klastrup have previously (2004) edited a Danish anthology of case studies of hypertext fiction, MMOGs, and other new media forms; Digitale verdener.

In 2005, Klastrup chaired the Digital Arts and Culture conference in collaboration with Susana Tosca. In 2008, she chaired the Ninth Annual Conference for the Association of Internet Researchers, Internet Research 9.0.

During the fall of 2009, Klastrup co-edited The International Handbook of Internet Research, with Jeremy Hunsinger and Matthew Allen, which was published by Springer Verlag in 2010. The work introduces several academic perspectives to the study of the internet as a social, communicative, and political phenomenon.

Klastrup maintained a research blog from 2001-2016, Klastrup's Cataclysms.

See also
Simulated reality

Selected publications

References 

1970 births
Danish mass media scholars
Date of birth missing (living people)
Electronic literature critics
Video game researchers
Living people
MUD scholars
Place of birth missing (living people)
Academic staff of the IT University of Copenhagen
Danish women academics